Hebdomad may refer to:

 On Hebdomads, a work of the Hippocratic Corpus
 Hebdomad, a term used by Neoplatonist philosophers such as Iamblichus and Proclus in reference to the intellect
 The Hebdomad, the seven world-creating archons in most Gnostic systems: see Archon (Gnosticism)#Hebdomad
 On Hebdomads (De hebdomadibus), a work of the Neoplatonist Boethius commented upon by Thomas Aquinas, in which the hebdomads are common mental conceptions or axioms
 The Celestial Hebdomad, the archons who make up the ruling council of Mount Celestia in Dungeons & Dragons

See also
 Hebdomadal Council